The Myth of Rock is the first full-length album by industrial/hip hop artists Consolidated, released in 1990. The album peaked at #24 on the CMJ Radio Top 150 while the album track "Dysfunctional Relationship" posted at #24 on the CMJ Radio Top Cuts.

Reception

Jason Pettigrew at Alternative Press lauded The Myth of Rock as "a fascinating palette of noises, beats and musique concrete" and noted that, on a political level, the band is intelligent and well informed, but warned that "nobody likes to be bludgeoned... while listening to records." Paul Davies from Q Magazine concurred with 'the sound is a bruisingly, hard-hitting and uncompromising as the message".

Track listing
 "Product"  – 4:26
 "This Is A Collective"  – 3:24
 "America Number One"  – 4:25
 "Weakness (Part I)"  – 0:53
 "Fight The Fascists"  – 6:26
 "Music That Lifts Up Our Savior Jesus Christ"  – 0:45
 "Josephine The Singer"  – 3:31
 "Poland"  – 2:59
 "Is This The Cheese Dip"  – 0:50
 "Message To The People"  – 4:11
 "Stop The War Against The Black Community"  – 1:05
 "White American Male (The Truth Hurts)"  – 4:48
 "Weakness (Part II)"  – 1:47
 "It's About That Time"  – 1:08
 "Love, Honor And Respect"  – 3:05
 "Strike"  – 4:42
 "Brian Wilson Speaks"  – 1:12
 "Dysfunctional Relationship"  – 2:51
 "There Is A Mountain Filled With Blood"  – 0:54
 "Consolidated"  – 3:33

References 

1990 debut albums
Consolidated (band) albums
Nettwerk Records albums